Alexander (Sandro) Antadze (born 5 May 1972 in Tbilisi, Georgia) is an artist and an architect. In 1996 he graduated from Tbilisi State Academy of Arts.

Group exhibitions
 1996 "Georgian Artists Show" El-Kuwait, Kuwait
 2000 "Peace and Colour Gallery" Gallery N 27, Cork Street, London, UK
 2001 "N Gallery" Exhibition, Georgia, Tbilisi
 2001 "Peace and Colour Gallery" Gallery N 27, Cork Street, London, UK
 2002 "Peace and Colour Gallery" Gallery N 27, Cork Street, London, UK
 2003 "Islington Arts Factory", Main Gallery, London, UK
 2004 "Soviet Artists Show" Town Hall, Manchester, UK
 2006 "Art-Manege Grafica" Tishnika 1, Moscow, Russia
 2006 "Opt-Art" Gov.Center of Contemporary Art. Zoologicheskaya 13. Moscow, Russia
 2006 "Caucasus Biennale Declaration" Baratashvili Street, Tbilisi, Georgia
 2008 "New Generation" Gallery Sharden, Tbilisi, Georgia
 2008 London Festival of Architecture, London, UK

Personal exhibitions
 2003 "Peace and Colour Gallery" Gallery 54, May Fair, London, UK
 2005 "Gudauri" Gallery, Gudauri, Georgia
 2005 "TMS" Gallery, Rustaveli Ave. 16, Tbilisi, Georgia
 2006 "Positivism" Contemporary Art Museum of Russia, Petrovka 25, Moscow, Russia
 2006 "Arbat" Georgian Cultural Center Mziuri, Arbat 42, Moscow, Russia
 2006 "L'Arcade Chausse-Cops" Vieille-ville 16, Geneva, Switzerland
 2006 Galerie "Ruines" Rue Des Vollandes 5, Geneva, Switzerland
 2007 "Arci" Gallery, Abuladze Street 5, Tbilisi, Georgia
 2007 Embassy of Georgia in The Hague, Netherlands,
 2007 Gallery "Artstable", Amsterdam, Netherlands
 2008 Merie de Lunel, Lunel, France,
 2008 "L'Arcade Chausse-Coqs" Vieille-ville 16. Geneva, Switzerland
 2008 "N Gallery & Sandro Antadze" 15 Perovskaia street. Tbilisi, Georgia
 2008 "Embassy of Georgia in Israel" Tel Aviv, Israel,
 2008 "N Gallery & Sandro Antadze""Christmas Exhibition" 15 Perovskaia Str. Tbilisi, Georgia
 2009 "N Gallery & Sandro Antadze""24 Hour" Exhibition, 15 Perovskaia Str. Tbilisi, Georgia

Alexander Antadze's works are in private collections in: Georgia, Great Britain, United States, France, Switzerland and other countries.

References

Painters from Georgia (country)
1972 births
Living people
Artists from Tbilisi
Tbilisi State Academy of Arts alumni